The Doré River is a tributary of the Fraser River in the Canadian province of British Columbia.

According to a trapper named Jack Damon, the river was originally called Fifty Mile Creek and was given the name doré, French for "golden", by a Norwegian prospector named Olson.

Course
The Doré River originates in the Cariboo Mountains, flowing generally north to join the Fraser River in the Robson Valley portion of the Rocky Mountain Trench just north of McBride.

See also
List of British Columbia rivers

References

Rivers of British Columbia
Tributaries of the Fraser River
Robson Valley